The 2014–15 season of the 1. Liga Promotion, the third tier of the Swiss football league system, was the third season of the league.

The season started on 5 August 2015 and finished on 28 May 2016. The league was won by Neuchâtel Xamax who was promoted to the Challenge League while FC Locarno and SR Delémont were relegated to the 1. Liga Promotion.

Table									
The 2014–15 season saw three new clubs in the league, FC Rapperswil-Jona and Neuchâtel Xamax, both promoted from the 1. Liga Classic, while FC Locarno had been relegated from the Challenge League.

Promotion round
The best eight teams of the three divisions of the 1. Liga Classic competed for two spots in the 2016–17 1. Liga Promotion:
Semi-finals

Finals

  First number, the Roman numeral, indicates division, second number indicates final position in division.

References

External links 
  

Swiss Liga Promotion
3